The Danish Nature Agency (Danish: Naturstyrelsen) is part of the Ministry of Environment, and deals with a number of tasks in nature conservation and forestry. In addition, the agency is in charge of operation and administration of the state-owned forests and the rest of Miljøministeriet's areas.  The agency advises the Secretary of State and the Government, and administers Danish planning law as to what makes it into the state's center for regional planning. The Forest and Nature Agency's sphere of operation is determined by Order nr. 963 as of 21 September 2004 and Order nr. 1485 as of 20 December 2005.

Objectives
The agency aims for a balanced development throughout the country
It is responsible for maintaining and restoring a diverse countryside
It seeks to strike a balance between nature and industry

Values
In 2005 the Nature Agency re-examined its values, and the management and staff have chosen five values as benchmark agency working methods:

Reliability based on professional competence, accountability, and honesty
Drive, i.e. the ability to transform knowledge into action
Cooperation, i.e. the agency's staff are responsive and cooperative partners for all interested parties
Job satisfaction though good opportunities for development and participation
Kindness to customers and the staff themselves

State Forest Districts 
, the 19 districts into which the Danish state forests are divided were called State Forest Districts. The State Forest Districts were all overseen by the Forest and Nature Agency.

State forest areas include, in addition to forests, lakes, streams, bogs, meadows, beaches, dunes and heaths.

The total state forest area is 192,000 ha (1,920 km2), i.e. about 4% of Denmark's land. About 109,000 ha (1.090 km2) of the land is wooded.

On 1 January 2008, the State Forest Districts were replaced by 19 local units. The 19 local units are:
Blåvandshuk
Bornholm
Fyn
Himmerland
Hovedstaden
Kronjylland
Midtjylland
Nordsjælland
Storstrøm
Søhøjlandet
Sønderjylland
Thy
Trekantsområdet
Vadehavet
Vendsyssel
Vestjylland
Vestsjælland
Øresund
Østsjælland

See also
 Directorate of State Forestry
 Danish Organisation for Renewable Energy
 Danish Society for Nature Conservation

External sources and references
Danish Forest and Nature Agency homepage

 Interactive map with protected areas in Denmark

Nature conservation in Denmark
Nature
Government agencies of Denmark
Forestry agencies
Environmental agencies
Forestry in Denmark